Shocking Loud Voice is an album by Japanese band Dazzle Vision. It is Dazzle Vision's sixth album. Shocking Loud Voice was released on May 4, 2012.

Music videos
On March 31, 2012, Dazzle Vision released its first music video for this album. The Second was released both on their official website and YouTube on March 31, 2012. A release date or video has not yet been announced or produced for the album's second single, "This Is What Rock n' Roll Looks Like", featuring Five Finger Death Punch's singer Ivan Moody. The song, however, was released on March 31, 2012, the same day as The Second.

Track listing

References

2012 albums
Dazzle Vision albums